David Gilbert Geach OBE (28 July 1923 – 25 February 2015) was a Royal Air Force bomb aimer during the Second World War. After the war, Geach was Registrar of Business Names for England and Wales until 1982. He also fought a long and ultimately successful campaign to have a memorial erected to lost RAF fliers at Lord's in London.

References

1923 births
2015 deaths
Royal Air Force personnel of World War II
British civil servants
People from Lambeth
Royal Air Force officers
British World War II prisoners of war
World War II prisoners of war held by Germany
Shot-down aviators